Robert Ford (born September 10, 1937) is a retired American football player, coach of football, lacrosse, golf, and wrestling, and college athletics administrator. Ford was appointed as the head coach of the University of Albany on April 27, 1970 where he remained until retiring after the 2013 season. From 1965 to 1968, Ford served as the head football coach at St. Lawrence University in Canton, New York.  He also coached golf and wrestling at Albright College in Reading, Pennsylvania, where was an assistant football coach from 1960 to 1963.  Ford was Albany's head men's lacrosse coach from 1971 to 1973 and athletic director from 1978 to 1982.

Head coaching record

Football
From the time he was appointed as the Albany head coach, Ford's teams played football as a club sport for three years, 1970 to 1972.  His coaching record during that period was 12–9–1.  Those 22 games are not included in the coaching record shown below.

See also
 List of college football coaches with 200 wins
 List of college football coaches with 30 seasons

References

1937 births
Living people
American football quarterbacks
Albany Great Danes athletic directors
Albany Great Danes football coaches
Albany Great Danes men's lacrosse coaches
Albright Lions football coaches
Albright Lions wrestling coaches
Springfield Pride football coaches
Springfield Pride football players
St. Lawrence Saints football coaches
College golf coaches in the United States
People from Holden, Massachusetts
Sportspeople from Worcester County, Massachusetts